St John Fisher Catholic Comprehensive School (simply referred to as SJF) is an 11–18 mixed, Roman Catholic, voluntary aided secondary school and sixth form in Chatham, Kent, England. It was established in 1964 and is located in the Roman Catholic Archdiocese of Southwark.

It is one of two genuine comprehensive schools in Medway, an authority that retains selection. Pupils also travel in from Sittingbourne and Sheppey in Kent. It is the only Catholic secondary school within the local authority and the only secondary school with two campuses. The main campus at Ordnance Street is for year 9 to 13, while years 7 and 8 are on a campus known as the Lower School, at 79 Maidstone Road.

Planning permission was given in March 2021, for the school to consolidate on a single site on City Way on existing playing fields.

Motto 
The school's motto,  means 'give back to God what belongs to God'.(Mark 12:17) This is a biblical reference referring to when Jesus was challenged by the Pharisees on the subject of taxation; Jesus was asked whether the Jews should pay taxes to the Romans or not.

History 
St John Fisher Catholic School was established in 1964 and is named after John Fisher, the Catholic bishop, Cardinal and martyr.

Academics 
The school operates a two-year Key Stage 3 which is provided on the Maidstone Road site. This is designed to build on the 'good work' of teachers in the principal feeder schools.

Students transfer to the Ordnance Street site for the three year Key Stage 4.

Sixth Form Centre 
Until the summer of 2010, the school's sixth form site was located at a separate building further up the road. It is now located at the main school site. Students are offered 21 A Levels and BTEC Level 3 courses.

Partner primary schools 
In case of oversubscription, priority goes to Catholic children and then to non-Catholics who have attended the following schools:
 English Martyrs’, Strood
 St Augustine of Canterbury, Rainham
 St Benedict’s, Lordswood
 St Edward’s, Sheppey
 St Mary’s, Gillingham
 St Michael’s, Chatham
 St Peter’s, Sittingbourne
 St Thomas More, Walderslade
 St Thomas of Canterbury, Rainham
 St William of Perth, Rochester

Notable alumni 
 James Jordan, ballroom dancer and choreographer
 Jimmy Corbett, footballer

References

External links 
 

Catholic secondary schools in the Archdiocese of Southwark
Secondary schools in Medway
Voluntary aided schools in England
Educational institutions established in 1964
1964 establishments in England